Alaaeldin is both a given name and a surname. Notable people with the name include:

Surname 
Ahmed Alaaeldin (born 1993), Qatari footballer
Mohammed Alaaeldin (born 1994), Qatari footballer

Given name
Alaaeldin Abouelkassem (born 1990), Egyptian fencer

See also
Aladdin (name)